The 2012 Four Continents Figure Skating Championships was an international figure skating competition in the 2011–12 season. It was held at the World Arena in Colorado Springs, USA on February 7–12. Medals were awarded in the disciplines of men's singles, ladies' singles, pair skating, and ice dancing.

Qualification
The competition was open to skaters from a non-European member nation of the International Skating Union who reached the age of 15 before July 1, 2011. The corresponding competition for European skaters was the 2012 European Championships.

Entries
The entries were as follows. Jeremy Abbott withdrew due to injury and was replaced by Richard Dornbush.

Results

Men

Ladies

Pairs

Ice dancing

Medals summary

Medalists
Medals for overall placement:

Small medals for placement in the short segment:

Small medals for placement in the free segment:

Medals by country
Table of medals for overall placement:

Table of small medals for placement in the short segment:

Table of small medals for placement in the free segment:

References

External links
 

2012
2012 in figure skating
Sports competitions in Colorado Springs, Colorado
International figure skating competitions hosted by the United States
2012 in sports in Colorado
February 2012 sports events in the United States